Ahiazu Mbaise is a Local Government Area of Imo State, Nigeria. It is as a result of a merger between Ahiara and Ekwerazu. Its headquarters are in the town of Afo oru. There are fourteen (14) towns that make up Ahiazu Mbaise. They include; Mpam, Ihitte Afor, Opara-Nadim, Akabor, Ogwuama/Amuzi, Obodo-Ujichi, Otulu/Aguneze, Umu-OKrika, Obohia, Ekwereazu, Obodo-Ahiara, Lude/Nnara-Mbia, Ogbe, Oru - Ahiara. The 12 wards in Ahiazu Mbaise local government area are:  Amuzi/Ihenworie, Mpam, Nnarambia, Obohia/Ekwereazu, Ogbe, Ogbor/Umueze, Okrika Nweke, Okrika Nwenkwo, Oparanadim, Oru-na-Lude, Otulu/Aguneze, Umunumo/Umuchieze.

 
It has an area of 114 km and a population of 170,902 at the 2006 census. The local government area is bounded to the north by Isiala Mbano and Ehime Mbano, to the east by Obowo and Ihitte Uboma, to the south by Ezinihitte Mbaise and Aboh Mbaise and to the west by Ikeduru.

The postal code of the area is 463.

References

Local Government Areas in Imo State
Local Government Areas in Igboland